This is a list of cities and towns in Fiji.

Cities
 Suva
 Nadi
 Lautoka
 Labasa

Incorporated towns
Fijian law defines "towns" as urbanized areas incorporated as municipal bodies, governed by Town Councils.

Ba
Lami
Levuka
Nausori
Savusavu
Sigatoka
Tavua
Rakiraki
Navua
Korovou
Nasinu
Labasa

Unincorporated towns
The following localities are urbanized, but have not been municipally organized.
 Vatukoula
 Nakasi
 Seaqaqa
 Dreketi
 Lomawai
 Korolevu
 Nadelei
 Natumbua

External links

 
Fiji, List of cities in
Cities
Fiji